Ossama Wassim Ashley (born 23 February 2000) is an English professional footballer who plays as a midfielder for Colchester United.

Playing career

AFC Wimbledon 
Ashley joined AFC Wimbledon's youth set-up in March 2017 after a spell in the Fulham Academy. On 5 December 2017, he made his professional debut as a substitute in a 2–0 EFL Trophy defeat at Yeovil Town. On 4 March 2019, he signed a professional contract with AFC Wimbledon after impressing playing for the under-23s. In June 2020 he was released by AFC Wimbledon after his contract expired.

West Ham United
On 2 September 2020, following a successful trial, Ashley signed for West Ham United on a one-year contract, with the option of further year. In May 2022, West Ham announced that Ashley would be leaving the club at the end of his contract in June 2022.

Colchester United
In July 2022, Ashley signed for Colchester United on a one-year contract.

Personal life
Born in England, Ashley is of Jamaican and Moroccan descent.

Statistics

References

External links
AFC Wimbledon profile

2000 births
Living people
Footballers from Greenwich
English footballers
English sportspeople of Jamaican descent
English people of Moroccan descent
Association football midfielders
AFC Wimbledon players
Billericay Town F.C. players
West Ham United F.C. players
Colchester United F.C. players
Black British sportspeople
National League (English football) players